Tartessian may refer to:

an ancient civilization based in Tartessos in modern-day Andalusia
Tartessian language
Southwest Paleohispanic script or Tartessian script

Language and nationality disambiguation pages